Hannes Schmidhauser (9 September 1926 – 29 January 2000) was a Swiss actor and footballer.

Football career
Born in Ticino, Schmidhauser began playing football with local side FC Locarno. He also was a competitive cyclist and worked as an actor.

He made his senior footballing debut with Locarno at age 15. He would sign with Grasshopper Club Zürich in 1942, and also played for FC Lugano, FC Young Fellows and German side Mannheim.

Schmidhauser made 13 appearances for the Switzerland national football team from 1952 to 1959. He made his debut in 0–3 friendly international loss to England.

Filmography

References

External links

1926 births
2000 deaths
Swiss male film actors
Swiss men's footballers
Switzerland international footballers
FC Locarno players
Grasshopper Club Zürich players
FC Lugano players
SC Young Fellows Juventus players
Swiss football managers
FC Lugano managers
20th-century Swiss male actors
Association football defenders